RTRS PLUS (Cyrillic: РТРС ПЛУС) is a Bosnian public cable TV channel operated by RTRS. The program is broadcast on a daily basis from RTRS headquarters located in Banja Luka. The radio and television program is mainly produced in Serbian and Cyrillic. This television channel broadcasts a variety of programs such as flash news, talk shows, documentaries, movies, mosaic, and children's programs.

See also
 RTRS
 BHRT
 RTRS
 RTVFBiH
 RTVHB

External links 
 
 Communications Regulatory Agency of Bosnia and Herzegovina

References

Mass media in Banja Luka
Publicly funded broadcasters
Television stations in Bosnia and Herzegovina
Multilingual broadcasters
Television channels and stations established in 2015
Radio Televizija Republike Srpske